

Calendar by month
Note: Sports that were originally intended to take place in 2020 and/or 2021 but were delayed due to the COVID-19 pandemic are indicated using .

January

February

March

April

May

June

July

August

September

October

November

December

References

 
Sports by year

Sports by month